Wright is an unincorporated community in Mahaska County, in the U.S. state of Iowa.

History
A post office was established at Wright in 1883, and remained in operation until it was discontinued in 1973. The community was named for a local landowner. Wright's population was 21 in 1902, and had increased to 115 by 1925.

References

Unincorporated communities in Mahaska County, Iowa
1883 establishments in Iowa
Unincorporated communities in Iowa
Populated places established in 1883